Dušan Radonjič (born 1941) is a Slovenian economist, university professor (University of Maribor) and member of the European Academy of Sciences and Arts (class of Social Sciences, Law and Economics).

Education and work
In Maribor he finished primary and high school; he studied economics at University of Ljubljana and Zagreb. At latter he completed PhD. He is a tenured professor at Faculty of Economics and Business and also at Faculty of Logistics.

He was also Dean of the school (1987) and twice Vice-Chancellor of University of Maribor (1996–97 and 2003–07).

In 2010 he was running for a position of Chancellor of University of Maribor; he received 4.4% of votes, the least among five candidates.

Currently he is a member of the board of directors of the European Council for Business Education (he was also a president at ECBE).

Politics
In 2008 Slovenian elections he unsuccessfully ran for MP seat as member of the political party Zares. He was party member for 7 months and resigned from the party after the elections.

On 28 May 2014 he was announced as a candidate for a position of Slovenian Prime Minister by seating MP Ivan Vogrin. Radonjič was Vogrin's mentor for his MA thesis in 1999. He didn't receive 10 required MP signatures to be officially named as a candidate.

Other
Between 1986 and 1990 he was president of the Maribor Sport Society Branik (Mariborsko športno društvo Branik).

In 2006 he received Golden crest of Maribor (Zlati grb mesta Maribor).

See also
List of members of the European Academy of Sciences and Arts

References

20th-century Slovenian economists
Members of the European Academy of Sciences and Arts
Zares politicians
Academic staff of the University of Marburg
University of Zagreb alumni
University of Ljubljana alumni
1941 births
Living people
Politicians from Maribor
21st-century Slovenian economists
Yugoslav economists